Steinberger is a surname. Notable people with the surname include:

Emil Steinberger (actor) (born 1933), Swiss comedian, writer, director and actor.
Gábor Darvas (formerly Gábor Steinberger) (1911–1985), Hungarian composer
Heinz Steinberger (born 1958), Austrian ice speed skater
Jack Steinberger (1921–2020), German-born physicist and Nobel Prize winner
Julia Steinberger (born 1974) American-born ecological economist
Justus Steinberger (?–1870), United States Army officer
Lucianne Goldberg (born Lucianne Steinberger, 1935), American literary agent
Michael Steinberger, American wine columnist of Slate
Ned Steinberger, American guitar designer, founder and namesake of the guitar company
Peter Steinberger, political philosopher and dean of faculty at Reed College

See also
 Steinberger (disambiguation)
 Steinberg (surname)

German-language surnames